Shokranlu (also Romanized as Shokrānlū; also known as Tūlkī) is a village in Howmeh Rural District, in the Central District of Shirvan County, North Khorasan Province, Iran. At the 2006 census, its population was 41, in 16 families.

References 

Populated places in Shirvan County